Sexo vs. sexo ("Sex vs. Sex") is a 1980 Mexican film. It stars Sara García. It was directed by Víctor Manuel Castro and was released on 24 February 1983. The screenplay was written by Jorge M. Isaac and Víctor Manuel Castro.

External links
 

1980 films
Mexican adventure comedy films
1980s Spanish-language films
1980s Mexican films
Mexican musical comedy films